Tutchone may refer to:

Northern Tutchone, a First Nations people of central Yukon Territory in Canada
Southern Tutchone, a First Nations people of southern Yukon Territory
Tutchone language, an Athabaskan language spoken by the Tutchone people

Language and nationality disambiguation pages